Division No. 7, Subd. E is an unorganized subdivision in eastern Newfoundland, Newfoundland and Labrador, Canada. It is in Division No. 7 on Bonavista Bay.

According to the 2016 Statistics Canada Census:
Population: 2,644
% Change (2011-2016): -2.6
Dwellings: 1,682
Area (km2.): 1,664.58
Density (persons per km2.): 1.6

Newfoundland and Labrador subdivisions